The 1949 edition of the Campeonato Carioca kicked off on July 3, 1949 and ended on December 11, 1949. It was organized by FMF (Federação Metropolitana de Futebol, or Metropolitan Football Federation). Eleven teams participated. Vasco da Gama won the title for the 8th time. no teams were relegated.

System
The tournament would be disputed in a double round-robin format, with the team with the most points winning the title.

Championship

Top Scores

References

Campeonato Carioca seasons
Carioca